Kullħadd is a Maltese weekly newspaper published by the Labour Party since 1993. The newspaper's name is both the Maltese word for "everyone", and a combination of the Maltese words "kull Ħadd" ("every Sunday").

External links
 

Maltese-language newspapers
Newspapers published in Malta
Publications established in 1993
Weekly newspapers
1993 establishments in Malta
Labour Party (Malta) publications